The Departure is a 2020 American drama film directed by Merland Hoxha, starring Grant Wright Gunderson, Kendall Chappell, Austin Lauer, Olivia Lemmon and Jon Briddell.

Cast
 Grant Wright Gunderson as Nate
 Kendall Chappell as Jessica
 Austin Lauer as John
 Olivia Lemmon as Amber
 Jon Briddell as Bruce

Release
The film was released on digital on June 12, 2020.

Reception
Bradley Gibson of Film Threat rated the film 7 stars out of 10 and called it "an entertaining film on the strength of the performances." Sean Axmaker of Video Librarian rated the film 2.5 stars out of 4 and called it "well-acted".

Barbara Kennedy of Ain't It Cool News gave the film a mixed review. Monica Castillo of RogerEbert.com gave the film a "thumbs down" and wrote that "It's as if we were watching an abusive relationship from the point-of-view of the manipulative partner."

References

External links
 
 

American drama films
2020 drama films